Northern Secondary School, or simply Northern, is a secondary school in the town of Sturgeon Falls, Ontario, in the Nipissing District of Ontario, Canada. It is operated by the Near North District School Board.

See also
List of high schools in Ontario

External links
Northern Secondary School

West Nipissing
High schools in Nipissing District
1971 establishments in Ontario

Educational institutions established in 1971
French-language high schools in Ontario